Sofiehem is a residential area in Umeå, Sweden. Located close to Umeå University and Norrlands Universtitetssjukhus, it has historically been a preferred area for academics and medical doctors to settle with their families.

External links
Sofiehem at Umeå Municipality

Umeå